American Broadcasting Company's entry into film began with their purchase of the Selznick library from the David O. Selznick estate. In 1965, ABC founded its own films production company ABC Pictures (or ABC Pictures International for international distribution) The studio's films would be distributed by Cinerama Releasing Corporation. The studio never turned a profit for ABC and was shut down in 1972.

In May 1979, ABC later returned to film production as ABC Motion Pictures with distribution by 20th Century Studios (then known as 20th Century Fox) The studio would close down in 1985.  Both ABC and 20th Century Studios are now owned by The Walt Disney Company.

List of films

References

Films
Disney-related lists
Lists of films by studio